Elnur Marat oglu Allahverdiyev (born 21 April 1978) is an Azerbaijani entrepreneur and politician who is a Member of the National Assembly of Azerbaijan (VI convocation).

Early life and education 
Elnur Allahverdiyev was born on April 21, 1978, in Baku. He received his bachelor education in Azerbaijan International University in 1995–99. From July 1999 to July 2000 he served in the military unit N of the Azerbaijani Armed Forces in Gazakh District. Then, he successfully completed his degree from "Legal Regulation of the Economy" faculty of Azerbaijan State University of Economics in 2015.

Career 
He worked as an adviser to the director of the Heydar Aliyev Center, then as the general director of ABC Telecom LLC. Allahverdiyev served as the chairman of the supervisory board of Azercell Telecom LLC. He terminated his entrepreneurial activity in connection with the Azerbaijan parliamentary election in 2020. From November 13, 2014, to December 29, 2019, he was the Honorary Consul of the Slovenia in Azerbaijan. He is a member of the New Azerbaijan Party.

Elnur Allahverdiyev is a Member of the National Assembly of Azerbaijan (VI convocation) for Yasamal #17.
He is fluent in English and Russian.

References 

1978 births
Politicians from Baku
Azerbaijan International University alumni
Azerbaijan State University of Economics alumni
Diplomats from Baku
Members of the National Assembly (Azerbaijan)
Living people
Businesspeople from Baku